The Council of the Arab League (also the Arab League Council) is the principal institution of the Arab League and was created by article 3 of the Charter of the Arab League.

Organisation
The Charter states that the Council is to be composed of representatives, as necessary heads of state, heads of government and foreign ministers, from the Arab League member states, each of which shall have a single vote irrespective of the number of representatives.

The presidency of the Council rotates among member states and the secretary-general is appointed by two-thirds majority.

The Council has seven special committees:
Political
Economic
Communications
Cultural
Legal
Social
Health

References

Bibliography

Arab League